Paweł Gawron (23 March 1921 – 1 October 1983) was a Polish gymnast. He competed in eight events at the 1952 Summer Olympics.

References

1921 births
1983 deaths
Polish male artistic gymnasts
Olympic gymnasts of Poland
Gymnasts at the 1952 Summer Olympics
People from Rydułtowy